Oriol Lozano Farrán (born 23 May 1981), known simply as Oriol, is a Spanish former footballer who played usually as a central defender.

During a 17-year professional career he played mainly for Racing de Santander, representing the club in all three major levels and appearing in 156 competitive matches whilst competing in six La Liga seasons.

Club career
Born in Sudanell, Lleida, Catalonia, Oriol played spent his early career with UE Lleida, CD Onda (in the fourth division, loaned by Villarreal CF who acted as Onda's parent club) and CE L'Hospitalet. In the 2004–05 season he was promoted from Racing de Santander's reserves, making his La Liga debut on 19 September 2004 in a 1–1 home draw against Villarreal.

Oriol went on to become a relatively important defensive element for the Cantabrians in the subsequent four seasons, playing a total of 75 games and starting 65. On 17 March 2007 he scored one of only three official goals for the club, in a 2–0 away win over Valencia CF.

Oriol appeared in 19 matches in the 2009–10 campaign, as Racing once again narrowly avoided relegation after finishing 16th – he was sent off twice, one of them in the last minute of the 1–0 defeat of Sporting de Gijón. In June 2010, the 29-year-old did not see his contract renewed and signed with Aris Thessaloniki F.C. of the Super League Greece.

Before retiring in 2015 at the age of 34, Oriol represented Real Murcia, FC Zestafoni (Georgian Erovnuli Liga) and Racing again. In September 2019 he joined Indian Super League side Bengaluru FC, as assistant manager under his compatriot Carles Cuadrat. The following January, he was replaced by goalkeeping coach Javier Pinillos.

References

External links

1981 births
Living people
People from Segrià
Sportspeople from the Province of Lleida
Spanish footballers
Footballers from Catalonia
Association football defenders
La Liga players
Segunda División players
Segunda División B players
UE Lleida players
CE L'Hospitalet players
Rayo Cantabria players
Racing de Santander players
Real Murcia players
Super League Greece players
Aris Thessaloniki F.C. players
Erovnuli Liga players
FC Zestafoni players
Spain youth international footballers
Catalonia international footballers
Spanish expatriate footballers
Expatriate footballers in Greece
Expatriate footballers in Georgia (country)
Spanish expatriate sportspeople in Greece
Spanish expatriate sportspeople in Georgia (country)
Spanish expatriate sportspeople in India